Joseph David Beck (March 14, 1866  –  November 8, 1936) was a Republican member of the United States House of Representatives from Wisconsin.

Born near Bloomingdale, in Vernon County, Wisconsin, Beck graduated from Stevens Point Normal School and the University of Wisconsin. He worked in the Wisconsin Bureau of Statistics and was a farmer and livestock dealer. Beck was elected a Republican to the Sixty-seventh United States Congress and to the three succeeding Congresses (March 4, 1921 – March 3, 1929). He was elected as the representative of Wisconsin's 7th congressional district. In 1928 he passed on running for another term in office to instead unsuccessfully ran for the Republican nomination of Governor of Wisconsin. Later Beck worked with the Wisconsin Department of Agriculture. He died in Madison, Wisconsin.

Workers' compensation 

Beck, along with John R. Commons of the University of Wisconsin, wrote and helped to pass Wisconsin's workers' compensation law, the first law of its type in the United States. (New York had passed a first Worker's Compensation Law, but that was nullified by the courts.) The aim of the law was to protect business corporations from tort suits. Workers who had sustained a work injury that rendered them unemployable could be awarded permanent and total disability payments, but were not allowed to sue their employers.

Notes

External links

1866 births
1936 deaths
People from Vernon County, Wisconsin
University of Wisconsin–Madison alumni
University of Wisconsin–Stevens Point alumni
Businesspeople from Wisconsin
Republican Party members of the United States House of Representatives from Wisconsin